Chinese theatre may refer to:

 Theatre of China
Chinese Village (Tsarskoe Selo), Russia, including the Chinese Opera Theatre of Catherine the Great
Grauman's Chinese Theatre, or TCL Chinese Theatre, in Hollywood, U.S.

See also
Chinese theater of World War II, or the Second Sino-Japanese War